Aleksandr Vasilyevich Pankratov-Chyorny (born 28 June 1949) is a Russian actor and film director. He appeared in more than seventy films since 1978.

He was awarded People's Artist of the Russian Federation (2009)   for great achievements in the field of cinematographic art.

Selected filmography

References

External links 

1949 births
Living people
People from Altai Krai
Russian male film actors
Soviet male film actors
Russian male stage actors
Soviet male stage actors
Russian male television actors
People's Artists of Russia
Honored Artists of the Russian Federation
Gerasimov Institute of Cinematography alumni
Soviet film directors
Russian film directors
Recipients of the Medal of the Order "For Merit to the Fatherland" II class
20th-century Russian male actors
21st-century Russian male actors